The Family Moskat  is a novel written by Isaac Bashevis Singer, originally written in Yiddish. It was Singer's first book published in English.

External links
 NY Times review of The Family Moskat
 The Family Moskat, by Isaac Bashevis Singer, Commentary Magazine, February 1951
 Nasrullah Mambrol, Analysis of Isaac Bashevis Singer’s The Family Moskat, Literary Theory and Criticism, October 11, 2022

1950 American novels
Novels by Isaac Bashevis Singer
Fictional Jews
Alfred A. Knopf books
Yiddish-language literature
Novels set in Poland
1950 debut novels
Literature first published in serial form